Round Grove Township is an inactive township in Macon County, in the U.S. state of Missouri.

Round Grove Township was established in 1872.

References

Townships in Missouri
Townships in Macon County, Missouri